"Latin Lingo" is a song by American hip hop group Cypress Hill. The song was released as the final single from the group's self-titled debut album. The song "Hand on the Glock" is a re-recorded version of the song "Hand on the Pump".

Music video
The song's music video primarily shows the group performing the song at a house.

Track listing

Chart positions

Notes
A  "Latin Lingo" did not enter the Hot R&B/Hip-Hop Songs chart, but peaked at number 5 on the Bubbling Under R&B/Hip-Hop Singles chart, which acts as a 25-song extension to the R&B/Hip-Hop Songs chart.

References

1991 songs
1992 singles
Cypress Hill songs
Ruffhouse Records singles
Spanglish songs
Hardcore hip hop songs
Songs written by DJ Muggs
Songs written by B-Real
Songs written by Sen Dog
Song recordings produced by DJ Muggs